PT First Media Tbk is an Indonesian media and telecommunications company which primarily focused on pay cable television and Internet services.

The company was primarily owned by the Lippo Group, but in late 2019 the group began reducing the shares it owned. By August 2021, Axiata (who operates the XL network) obtained the majority shares of First Media's subsidiary, LinkNet.

References

1994 establishments in Indonesia
2000 initial public offerings
Cable television companies
Companies based in Jakarta
Companies listed on the Indonesia Stock Exchange
Internet service providers of Indonesia
Mass media companies established in 1994
Mass media companies of Indonesia
Telecommunications companies established in 1994
Telecommunications companies of Indonesia